Coggeshall Abbey, situated south of the town of Coggeshall in Essex, was founded in 1140 by King Stephen of England and Matilda of Boulogne, as a Savigniac house but became Cistercian in 1147 upon the absorption of the order.

History 
In 1216 an incident was recorded that "King John's army violently entered the abbey and carried off twenty-two horses of the bishop of London and others." It is also known that the reigning abbot in 1260 was travelling abroad as the envoy of the King. By 1370 the monastery was reported to be very poor, partly due to excessive spending and other mismanagement. Furthermore, during the so-called Peasants Revolt of 1381, the abbey was broken into and raided.
On the eve of the suppression of the monastery many, possibly false, charges were made against the abbot, William Love, and in 1536 he was relieved of his duties. The abbey was heavily in debt by the time of its closure in 1538, following which the site was sold to Sir Thomas Seymour.

The abbey church was rapidly ransacked and demolished. A house was built in 1581 on part of the monastery site and still stands. The abbey gate chapel survives restored as 'St. Nicholas Chapel', which hosts a monthly Sunday service.

The will of John Sharpe (courtier), dated 1518, indicates that he held a lease of "mansion and lodgings at Coggeshall Abbey". A similar later lease survives for Clement Harleston, granted in 1528, and shows that these buildings were next to the infirmary.

See also 
List of monastic houses in Essex
List of abbeys and priories in England
List of English abbeys, priories and friaries serving as parish churches

References 

 'Houses of Cistercian monks: Abbey of Coggeshall', A History of the County of Essex: Volume 2 (1907), pp. 125–29. 
 Anthony New. 'A Guide to the Abbeys of England And Wales', p117-18. Constable.

1538 disestablishments in England
Religious organizations established in the 1140s
Cistercian monasteries in England
Monasteries in Essex
Grade I listed churches in Essex
Christian monasteries established in the 12th century
1140 establishments in England
Grade I listed monasteries
Coggeshall
Stephen, King of England